Highlight film is a video synopsis of an athletic team's entire season, especially one produced about such a team in the United States.

The practice of teams producing highlight films appears to have emerged gradually during the 1970s; a particularly notable offering of this genre was that of the 1979 Dallas Cowboys; its title, America's Team, ended up being popularly applied to the club itself.

Today virtually all American sports teams produce annual highlight films, regardless of the outcome (good or bad) of the club's season; originally turned out as video cassettes, they are more commonly now done in DVD format.

See also
NFL Films

Film genres